Rui Miguel Rodrigues Pereira de Andrade (born 6 December 1977 in Lisbon) is a Portuguese retired footballer who played as a midfielder.

External links

1977 births
Living people
Footballers from Lisbon
Portuguese footballers
Association football midfielders
Liga Portugal 2 players
Segunda Divisão players
Clube Oriental de Lisboa players
S.C. Olhanense players
S.C. Covilhã players
F.C. Marco players
C.D. Pinhalnovense players
Atlético Clube de Portugal players
C.D. Mafra players
Cypriot First Division players
Cypriot Second Division players
Doxa Katokopias FC players
Ermis Aradippou FC players
Atromitos Yeroskipou players
Portuguese expatriate footballers
Expatriate footballers in Cyprus
Portuguese expatriate sportspeople in Cyprus